Rosemont station is a Montreal Metro station in the borough of Rosemont–La Petite-Patrie in Montreal, Quebec, Canada. It is operated by the Société de transport de Montréal (STM) and serves the Orange Line. The station opened on October 14, 1966, as part of the original network of the Metro.

Overview 
The station, designed by Duplessis, Labelle et Derome, is a normal side platform station built into a tunnel. It has a ticket barrier at transept level that leads to a single entrance, adjacent to a bus loop and to a municipal parking lot.

In 2015, work began to make the station accessible at a cost of around $10m. This work was completed in January 2017, following the installation of three elevators. The OMHM is building a complex on top of the metro as well a public square on the behalf of the city of Montréal.

Origin of the name
This station is named for boulevard Rosemont, the main street of the Rosemont district. This area was developed on an area purchased by land speculators Ucal-Henri Dandurand and Herbert Holt from the Canadian Pacific Railway; it was incorporated as the Village of Rosemont in 1915, named by Dandurand in honour of his mother, née Rose Phillips.

Connecting bus routes

Nearby points of interest
Aide Juridique (Place de la mode)
École des métiers de l'automobile
Monastère des Carmélites
Cour du Québec (Chambre de la jeunesse)
Centre d'accueil Gouin-Rosemont

References

External links

Rosemont Station - official site
Montreal by Metro, metrodemontreal.com - photos, information, and trivia
 2011 STM System Map
 Metro Map

Accessible Montreal Metro stations
Orange Line (Montreal Metro)
Railway stations in Canada opened in 1966
Rosemont–La Petite-Patrie